Régis Castant (born 15 September 1973) is a French former professional footballer who played as a midfielder. In his career, he played for Bordeaux, Trélissac, Stade Bordelais, and Libourne.

Honours 
Bordeaux

 UEFA Cup runner-up: 1995–96

Libourne

 Championnat de France Amateur: 2002–03 Group D

References 

1973 births
Living people
Sportspeople from Gironde
French footballers
Association football midfielders
FC Girondins de Bordeaux players
Trélissac FC players
Stade Bordelais (football) players
FC Libourne players
French Division 3 (1971–1993) players
Championnat National 2 players
Ligue 1 players
Championnat National players
Ligue 2 players
French football managers
FC Libourne managers
Footballers from Nouvelle-Aquitaine